Carex petitiana is a species of sedge in the family Cyperaceae that lives in swamps and bogs at altitudes of  in Cameroon, the Democratic Republic of Congo, Ethiopia, Kenya, Malawi, Nigeria, Tanzania, Uganda and Zimbabwe. Two subspecies are recognised:
C. petitiana subsp. attenuata  – only recorded from Malawi and Zimbabwe
C. petitiana subsp. petitiana (Kük.) Luceño & M. Escudero – throughout the species' range

References

petitiana
Flora of Africa
Plants described in 1850
Taxonomy articles created by Polbot